Xu Xingde (born 12 June 1984 in Yunnan) is a Chinese race walker.

He won the silver medal at the 2002 World Junior Championships and finished ninth in the 20 km distance at the 2004 World Race Walking Cup. He also competed at the 2003 World Championships.

References

1984 births
Living people
Chinese male racewalkers
Athletes from Yunnan